William Nyman Ashenfelter (October 16, 1924 in Collegeville, Pennsylvania – June 4, 2010) was an American track and field athlete known for long-distance events.  He was the younger brother of Horace Ashenfelter.  In the Steeplechase at the 1952 Olympic Trials, both brothers ran together, with Horace edging ahead to take the win in the last lap.  Both brothers broke the American record that had been held for 16 years by Harold Manning and both brothers qualified to run in the 1952 Olympics.  While Bill was unable to finish his trial heat, Horace went on to win the gold medal in world record time.  But Bill was not left out of making the world record book.  A month earlier, Bill joined Reggie Pearman, John Barnes, and Mal Whitfield to set the world record in the 4 × 800 metres relay at 7:29.2.

Bill was the 1954 American champion in the 2 mile steeplechase.  In 1951 he won the USA Cross Country Championships.  Horace won the championships in 1954–5, completing the only set of brothers to win the championships.

References

1924 births
2010 deaths
People from Collegeville, Pennsylvania
American male middle-distance runners
American male steeplechase runners
Olympic track and field athletes of the United States
Athletes (track and field) at the 1952 Summer Olympics
Athletes (track and field) at the 1955 Pan American Games
Sportspeople from Pennsylvania
United States Army personnel of World War II
Pan American Games track and field athletes for the United States
20th-century American people